The 2005 Philippine Basketball Association (PBA) rookie draft was an event at which teams drafted players from the amateur ranks. It was the first PBA Draft to feature only two rounds of drafting and the first draft held in August due to the league's adjustment of the season calendar. It was held on August 14, 2005 at the Sta. Lucia East Grand Mall in Cainta, Rizal.

Round 1

Round 2

Undrafted players
Draftee's name followed by college. All undrafted players become free agents.

Note
*All players are Filipinos until proven otherwise.

References

Philippine Basketball Association draft
draft